Nostra Signora di Coromoto is a 20th-century parochial church and titular church in southwest Rome, dedicated to Our Lady of Coromoto.

History 

The church was built in 1976–78; contributions from Italian Venezuelans led it to be named for that country's patron, Our Lady of Coromoto. It is visited by Venezuelans but is not their official national church. It is square, with a cross-beam roof of laminated wood. The presbytery is illuminated from above by natural light.

Pope John Paul II visited in 1981. On 25 May 1985, it was made a titular church to be held by a cardinal-deacon. The title is named Nostra Signora di Coromoto e San Giovanni di Dio, because the church was originally to be dedicated to Saint John of God, but that is not the name of the church.

Cardinal-protectors
Rosalio José Castillo Lara (1985–2007);  elevated to cardinal-priest pro hac vice in 1996
Fernando Filoni (2012–present); elevated to cardinal-bishop pro hac vice in 2018

References

External links

Titular churches
Rome Q. XII Gianicolense
Roman Catholic churches completed in 1978
20th-century Roman Catholic church buildings in Italy